A numeral is a figure, symbol, or group of figures or symbols denoting a number. It may refer to:

 Numeral system used in mathematics
 Numeral (linguistics), a part of speech denoting numbers (e.g. one and first in English)
 Numerical digit, the glyphs used to represent numerals

See also
 Numerology, belief in a divine relationship between numbers and coinciding events